Moody's most often refers to Moody's Investors Service, an American credit-rating agency. 

Other uses of the term may include:

In business:
Moody's Analytics, a global risk management software company based in New York City, USA
Moody's Corporation, parent company of Moody's Investors Service and Moody's Analytics 
Moodyz, a Japanese adult video producer

Places:
 Moody's Corner, Nova Scotia, Canada

Other:
Moody (disambiguation)
Moody (surname)